Besættelse (English: Possession) is a 1944 Danish film noir directed by Bodil Ipsen and starring Johannes Meyer and Berthe Qvistgaard. Based upon a novel by Hans Severinsen, the film is a dark psychological drama about an aging businessman whose erotic obsession with a cynical young woman leads to his eventual downfall.

Cast

References

External links 
 
Besættelse at Den Danske Film Database (in Danish)
Besættelse at Det Danske Filmistitut (in Danish)

Danish crime films
1940s Danish-language films
Film noir
Films directed by Bodil Ipsen
1944 films
1944 crime films
Danish black-and-white films